The Abita Springs Pavilion, at the northwestern end of Main Street in Abita Springs in St. Tammany Parish, Louisiana, was built in 1888.  It was listed on the National Register of Historic Places in 1975.

The 1975 National Register nomination noted that "At one time there was a long wooden foot bridge that went to the upper level. Railings that went around the upper level are now missing and should be replaced." and "The Springs themselves were cemented over by the State and should be opened. (The Pavilion is built over the Springs.)"

See also
Abita Springs Historic District, NRHP-listed later

References

External links

National Register of Historic Places in Louisiana
Buildings and structures completed in 1888
St. Tammany Parish, Louisiana